Ben William Harmison (born 9 January 1986) is an English former professional cricketer who played first-class cricket for Durham and Kent. The former England Under-19 left-handed batsman scored a century on his first-class debut in 2006 while playing for Durham against Oxford UCCE. He finished the season with 563 runs at an average of 37.53 with two hundreds, though both hundreds came in games outside the County Championship. He hit his maiden Championship century, 101 against Warwickshire in 2007.

On 19 December 2011, Harmison signed for Kent after being released by Durham in September. He played for Kent until the end of the 2015 season before leaving the county in February 2016 after four seasons. He played in Australia for Newcastle City Cricket Club in New South Wales during the English off-season.

He also plays football, as a striker, joining the Ashington side managed by his older brother Steve at the end of the 2016 cricket season, although he had also played for Ashington during his cricket career. He scored on his full debut in September 2015 in the F.A. Vase win over Easington Colliery.

References

External links

1986 births
Living people
Durham cricketers
English cricketers
Sportspeople from Ashington
Northumberland cricketers
Kent cricketers
English footballers
Ashington A.F.C. players
Association football forwards
Cricketers from Northumberland